Geronimo Cristobal is a Filipino writer.

References 

Living people
Filipino writers
Year of birth missing (living people)